Chmara is a gender-neutral Slavic surname. Notable people with this surname include:
Gregori Chmara (1893–1970), Ukrainian-born stage and film actor
Mirosław Chmara (born 1964), Polish pole vaulter 
Sebastian Chmara (born 1971), Polish decathlete, cousin of Mirosław

See also
 
Chara (given name)
Khmara (disambiguation)
Khmara (surname)

Polish-language surnames
Belarusian-language surnames